Lozano may refer to:

Places 
 Lozano, Jujuy, a rural municipality and village in Jujuy Province in Argentina
 Lozano, Texas, a census-designated place in Cameron County, United States
 Padre Lozano, a village and rural municipality in Salta Province in northwestern Argentina

People 
Lozano (surname)